Kara Best Clips is the first music video compilation and fourth DVD by the South Korean girl group Kara. It was released on February 23, 2011 in two editions: Regular and Limited. It ranked #1 in Oricon Weekly DVD Chart for two consecutive weeks with 132,132 copies sold in first week.

A Blu-ray edition of the DVD was released on February 29, 2012.

Track listing

Chart performance 
It debuted #1 in the Oricon daily chart and eventually became #1 in the Oricon weekly chart making the group the first foreign "female" artist to top the composite DVD ranking chart since its inception in 1999. The previous record was held by Chinese group Twelve Girls Band's, "Twelve Girls Band: First Premium Concert in Japan" (January 26, 2004) and American artist Britney Spears's Greatest Hits: My Prerogative (December 20, 2004) have come in at #2 on Oricon's Weekly Composite DVD Ranking. Furthermore, Kara sold 132,000 copies of their music video collection "Kara Best Clips" in their first week and this is the greatest amount sold for a "music video collection" for a female artist; not including live performance DVDs. The previous top seller was Mai Kuraki's "First Cut" (November 20, 2000), which sold 99,000 copies. Kuraki has held the record for 10 years and 3 months, but Kara has just taken her record away. In total, there have been only 6 foreign artists who have made it to number one on the Weekly DVD Composite Ranking: Kara, The Beatles, Led Zeppelin, Tohoshinki (TVXQ), Junsu/Jejung/Yuchun (JYJ) and Michael Jackson.

Charts

Sales and certifications

Kara Best Clips II & Shows 

Kara Best Clips II & Shows is a second part of the music video compilation "Kara Best Clips" and also first live DVD of the group. It was released on February 29, 2012 in 2 formats: DVD and Blu-ray and 2 different editions: Limited (with 3 discs) and Regular edition (with 2 discs). Disc 2 includes the show "Now, the Word You Want to Give... KARA JAPAN COME BACK 2011", held in Yokohama, Japan. It was the first showcase of the group in Japan.

Track listing

Charts

Sales and certifications

Release history

References 

Kara (South Korean group) albums
2011 video albums
2012 video albums
2011 compilation albums
Music video compilation albums
Universal Records video albums
Universal Records compilation albums
Albums recorded at the Yokohama Arena